"Señor Blues" is a composition by Horace Silver. The original version, an instrumental by Silver's quintet, was recorded on November 10, 1956. It has become a jazz standard. Silver later wrote lyrics, which were first recorded by Silver's band with Bill Henderson singing in 1958.

Composition
"'Señor Blues' is a 12/8 Latin piece with a dark, exotic flavor that recalls no other jazz composer as much as Duke Ellington. The first two chords are E minor and B7, resembling (whether consciously intended or not) one of Ellington's favorite harmonic gestures."

Original recording
The piece was first recorded on November 10, 1956, by the Horace Silver Quintet, of Silver (piano), Hank Mobley (tenor saxophone), Donald Byrd (trumpet), Doug Watkins (bass), and Louis Hayes (drums). Scott Yanow commented that Señor Blues' officially put Horace Silver on the map". It was released as part of the Blue Note Records album 6 Pieces of Silver. The track was a minor hit and was released as a 45-rpm single by Blue Note.

References

1950s jazz standards
1956 songs
Compositions by Horace Silver